Samadiyeh (also Romanized as Samadīyeh; also known as Şomeydīyeh) is a village in Jazireh-ye Minu Rural District, Minu District, Khorramshahr County, Khuzestan Province, Iran. At the 2006 census, its population was 169, in 40 families.

References 

Populated places in Khorramshahr County